Ruslan Elá Eyene (born 7 November 1983), known as Elá, is an Equatoguinean retired footballer who played as a left back or a central defender.

Club career
Elá was born in Las Palmas, Canary Islands, Spain. In his nine-year senior career he never played in higher than the Spanish fourth division, representing CF Sporting Mahonés, CD Villanueva, CD Lumbreras, CD Logroñés (two spells), CF Villanovense, CD Benicarló, CD Blanes, CF Gavà, CD Masnou and FC Levante Las Planas, retiring at only 27.

International career
Elá earned six caps for Equatorial Guinea. Two of those arrived during the 2006 FIFA World Cup qualifiers, in the tie against Togo national football team (1–0 home win, 0–2 away loss).

Personal life
Elá's older brother, Jacinto, was also a footballer. A winger, he too played mostly in Spanish amateur football, having an unsuccessful spell with Southampton.

Ruslan also worked at Admissions Test de Nivell in Esplugues de Llobregat.

References

External links

1983 births
Living people
Spanish sportspeople of Equatoguinean descent
Footballers from Las Palmas
Citizens of Equatorial Guinea through descent
Spanish footballers
Equatoguinean footballers
Association football defenders
Tercera División players
Divisiones Regionales de Fútbol players
CF Damm players
CD Logroñés footballers
CF Villanovense players
CF Gavà players
CD Masnou players
Equatorial Guinea international footballers